The Sediment Retention Structure is an earthen dam,  long and  high, on the North Fork Toutle River in the U.S. state of Washington. Completed by the United States Army Corps of Engineers in 1989, it is meant to prevent sediment from the 1980 eruption of Mount St. Helens from increasing flood risks along the Toutle and Cowlitz rivers.

The Corps initially expected the basin behind the dam to be filled by 2035 with 258 million cubic yards (197 million m3) of sediment. However, additional debris flows from Mount St. Helens plus sediment from storm-related riverbank failures quickly filled the basin. It was nearly full by 2012, and large amounts of sediment overflowed the SRS and continued downstream.

The higher spillway reduces the slope of the sediment plain behind the dam, thus allowing more debris to accumulate on top of existing debris. The Corps estimated that the higher spillway would maintain the trapping efficiency of the SRS at or above 31 percent—the fraction being trapped without the higher spillway—for 5 to 10 years after completion of the project.

Large communities downstream of the SRS include Castle Rock, Kelso, and Longview.

References

Dams in Washington (state)
Buildings and structures in Cowlitz County, Washington
Dams completed in 1989
Mount St. Helens